Mart Juur (born 29 September 1964 in Tartu) is an Estonian writer, humorist, journalist, music critic, editor and television presenter.

He has been the presenter of several television programs, such as Rahva oma kaitse and Ärapanija.

His daughter is musician and environmental activist Maria Minerva.

Selected works
Jamasuutra (1991)
Eesti ajakirjanduse kogutud pärlid Vol. 2 (1998)
Lollipop (1999)
Arkaadi A.  (2001)
Huumori kool (2008)
Pane eesti peale tagasi (2008)
Naeruklubi (2010)
101 Eesti popmuusika albumit
Hea tuju raamat (2018)

References

Living people
1964 births
Estonian male writers
20th-century Estonian writers
21st-century Estonian writers
Estonian humorists
Estonian journalists
Estonian editors
Estonian television presenters
Recipients of the Order of the White Star, 4th Class
University of Tartu alumni
Writers from Tartu
People from Tartu